Joan Ursula Penton Vaughan Williams (née Lock, formerly Wood; 15 March 1911 – 23 October 2007) was an English poet and author, and biographer of her second husband, the composer Ralph Vaughan Williams.

Biography
Born in Valletta, Malta, the daughter of Major-General Sir Robert Lock and his wife Kathleen Beryl Penton, daughter of Arthur Pole Penton CB, CMG, CVO, she began writing poetry in 1921. In 1941, her first published book of poems appeared, No Other Choice. Her second volume of poetry was Fall of Leaf, from 1943.

In the early 1930s, she was a student at the Old Vic. In 1933 she married Michael Forrester Wood, an army officer. She met Ralph Vaughan Williams in 1938, after she sent him a play which she had hoped he would set to music. The meeting led eventually to their collaboration on the choral work Epithalamion. She and Vaughan Williams began an affair whilst still married to their respective spouses. Michael Wood died in 1942 whilst on Army duty, of a heart attack. After his death, Ursula Wood continued her relationship with Vaughan Williams, with the acknowledgement of Vaughan Williams' wife Adeline, an invalid who was crippled by arthritis, Ursula Wood became Ralph's literary advisor and personal assistant.

Adeline Vaughan Williams died in 1951. Ursula Wood and Ralph Vaughan Williams married in February 1953. She encouraged her husband to resume the composition he had been forced to set aside during his first wife's illness, writing the libretto to two of his last choral works, including the cantata for Christmas Hodie. Ralph Vaughan Williams died in 1958. Following his death, Ursula Vaughan Williams set up residence in Gloucester Crescent near Regent's Park, London.

In 1964, she published RVW: A Biography of Ralph Vaughan Williams. She completed her autobiography, Paradise Remembered, in 1972, but did not publish the book until 2002. Additionally, she published four novels, including Set to Partners (1968) and The Yellow Dress (1984), and five volumes of poetry. She provided libretti for other composers, including Herbert Howells, Malcolm Williamson and Elisabeth Lutyens, for example, her famous "Hymn to St. Cecilia", which was put to music by Howells.

Vaughan Williams lived for many years in Gloucester Crescent near Camden Town, where her neighbours included Alan Bennett and David Gentleman. She appears as a character in Bennett's autobiographical play and film The Lady in the Van, where she is played by Frances de la Tour.

Until her death in London at age 96, she was honorary president of the Ralph Vaughan Williams Society. She was also the president of the English Folk Dance and Song Society. Her funeral was held at St John's Wood Church.

Bibliography
 The Complete Poems of Ursula Vaughan Williams
 RVW: A Biography of Ralph Vaughan Williams by Ursula Vaughan Williams
 There was a time... A pictorial journey from the collection of Ursula Vaughan Williams
 Paradise Remembered (autobiography)
 The Collected Poems of Ursula Vaughan Williams

References

External links 
 Ralph Vaughan Williams Society

1911 births
2007 deaths
English women poets
English biographers
People from Valletta
Ralph Vaughan Williams
English opera librettists
Women opera librettists
Women biographers
20th-century biographers
20th-century English women writers
20th-century English poets
English autobiographers
Women autobiographers